The Senate Armed Services Subcommittee on Strategic Forces is one of seven subcommittees within the Senate Armed Services Committee.

Jurisdiction
The Strategic Forces Subcommittee has jurisdiction over strategic forces, nuclear weapons, national defense and nuclear deterrence, space programs, and ballistic missile defense.

Members, 118th Congress

Historical subcommittee rosters

117th Congress

116th Congress

115th Congress

See also

U.S. House Armed Services Subcommittee on Strategic Forces

References

External links
Senate Armed Services Committee home page
Senate Armed Services Committee subcommittee list and membership page

Armed Services Strategic Forces